CNaVT, or Certificaat Nederlands als Vreemde Taal (Certificate of Dutch as Foreign Language), is an internationally recognised certificate proving the language ability in Dutch language of the holders. To obtain the certificate, Dutch learners must pass the CNaVT examination, organised by the Catholic University of Leuven. The Dutch Language Union has commissioned this collaboration. CNaVT is also a member of the Association of Language Testers in Europe (ALTE). The examinations is set according to different levels in the Common European Framework of Reference for Languages and is offered in accordance to various needs of the examinees. The certificate is widely recognised as proof of ability in Dutch in the Netherlands and Belgium and is useful for immigration, work and admission to educational institutions.

Organisation
The CNaVT examination is organised by CNaVT, a government-subsidised non-profit organisation affiliated with the Catholic University of Leuven in Belgium. CNaVT operates under the auspices of the Dutch Language Union, which aims at strengthening the international status of the Dutch language by creating an infrastructure for a joint language policy, and by integrating the Dutch speaking people in the Netherlands with the Dutch speaking (Flemish) community in Belgium. Within this framework, CNaVT designs and develops this proficiency tests, develops and maintains a database of tests and test tasks for use by teachers teaching Dutch as a foreign language, and conducts research to provide these tests with a scientific basis.

The Centre for Language and Education of the Catholic University of Leuven is responsible for managing and implementing the CNaVT project. From 2010 until 2015, there was a cooperation agreement with Fontys University of Applied Sciences to implement the project.

Examination
The examination takes place once every year in May and registration normally ends by mid-March. Candidates can take the exam in their home country, usually with help from Dutch teachers there. The current recommended registration fee is 75 euros.

Various profile exams and levels
As people learn Dutch for various reasons, the CNaVT developed different profile exams and has adopted the current format since 2003. Different profile exams prove that the holder has mastered enough Dutch to be able to use it in different contexts. The various profile exams correspond to different levels in the Common European Framework of Reference for Languages (CECR).

Format
The exam consists of three parts. In part A listening ability is tested and examinees need to complete tasks based on different audio fragments. In part B reading and writing proficiency is tested. Part C tests examinees' ability in oral communication. Parts A and B are tested in a classroom setting while in Part C the examiner and the candidate have a one-on-one conversation.

Candidates may use a dictionary in Part A (listening) and Part B (writing), but not in Part C (oral).

CNaVT and ALTE
The CNaVT has been a member institute of the Association of Language Testers in Europe (ALTE) since 1996 and exchanges expertise with other members in the area of language examination.

Enrollment
Although enrolment varies, on average more than 2000 candidates take the examination every year.

Results
The exam papers are sent to the Catholic University of Leuven for marking, and results are announced in July. Candidates who have passed receive a certificate. 

The passing rate varies in different profile exams.

Recognition
Those who have passed PMT, PPT, Educatief Startbekwaam or Educatief Professioneel are exempted from the language tests of the integration exams, i.e. "Inburgeringsexamen or Naturalisatietoets" for immigration to the Netherlands. But the parts concerning the immigrants' knowledge of the Netherlands ("Kennis van de Nederlandse Samenleving or KNS") cannot be exempted.

In Flanders (Belgium) and the Netherlands, in many universities and colleges, foreign students who have obtained the Educatief Startbekwaam or Educatief Professioneel certificates (and former PTHO and PAT certificates) are regarded as already fulfilled the language requirement for registration. In Flanders, in the area of education, a diploma from a recognised institution by the CNaVT can be presented as a proof of a sufficient level of language to work in the sector.

See also
 Staatsexamen Nederlands als tweede taal

References

External links
 The home page of CNaVT

Language tests
Dutch language